William Henry Massey (1871–1940), was an American first baseman in Major League Baseball for the Cincinnati Reds. He played in 13 games for the 1894 Reds during September, 1894. His minor league playing career lasted through 1909, during which he would win at least one pennant, the 1907 championship of the Connecticut League, while playing for the Holyoke Papermakers.

References

External links

1871 births
1940 deaths
Major League Baseball first basemen
Baseball players from Philadelphia
19th-century baseball players
Cincinnati Reds players
Reading Actives players
Philadelphia Colts players
Scranton Indians players
Shenandoah Huns players
Carbondale Anthracites players
Scranton Miners players
Scranton Red Sox players
Rochester Patriots players
Ottawa Wanderers players
Springfield Ponies players
Springfield Maroons players
Bristol Bell Makers players
Hartford Indians players
Buffalo Bisons (minor league) players
Wooden Nutmegs players
Toronto Maple Leafs (International League) players
Kansas City Blues (baseball) players
San Francisco Seals (baseball) players
Indianapolis Indians players
Holyoke Paperweights players
Lawrence Colts players
Lowell Tigers players